drawMD is an application made by Visible Health for clinicians to explain medical conditions, procedures, and anatomy to patients. The app is available on the Apple platform, Android platform, and Web.

Designed by two surgeons seeking to improve patient education drawMD utilizes a simple interface across multiple platforms to allow anyone to annotate drawMD's original medical illustrations, created by Joanna Culley of Medical-Artist.com, to enhance patient comprehension. Users can modify the illustrations to roughly match the disease state of the patient by sketching, applying stamps, or typing directly on the detailed anatomic images included in the application.

The background templates and the stamps that can be applied to those templates are made by a medical illustrator under the direction of an expert. There are enough illustrations to cover more than a dozen medical specialties and enable clinicians to easily provide personalized treatment plans, medical procedures in an easy to understand format. Clinicians can share the work they create in drawMD through email or printing their drawings or retain them for documenting their consultation. drawMD was originally designed for the iPad and specifically for urology. There is now a version of drawMD that contained the artwork of all the specialties.

References

External links

Medical Illustrator's website

IOS software
Application software
Medical software